Zizhi Tongjian is a pioneering reference work in Chinese historiography, published in 1084 AD during the Northern Song dynasty in the form of a chronicle recording Chinese history from 403 BC to 959 AD, covering 16 dynasties and spanning almost 1400 years. The main text is arranged into 294 scrolls (juan , equivalent to a chapter) totaling about 3 million Chinese characters.

In 1065 AD, Emperor Yingzong of Song commissioned his official Sima Guang (1019–1086 AD) to lead a project to compile a universal history of China, and granted him funding and the authority to appoint his own staff. His team took 19 years to complete the work and in 1084 AD it was presented to Emperor Yingzong's successor Emperor Shenzong of Song. It was well-received and has proved to be immensely influential among both scholars and the general public. Endymion Wilkinson regards it as reference quality: "It had an enormous influence on later Chinese historical writing, either directly or through its many abbreviations, continuations, and adaptations. It remains an extraordinarily useful first reference for a quick and reliable coverage of events at a particular time.", while Achilles Fang wrote "[Zizhi Tongjian], and its numerous re-arrangements, abridgments, and continuations, were practically the only general histories with which most of the reading public of pre-Republican China were famililar."

The text

The principal text of the Zizhi Tongjian of 294 scrolls is a year-by-year chronological narrative of the history of China, sweeping through many Chinese historical periods (Warring States, Qin, Han, Three Kingdoms, Jin and the Sixteen Kingdoms, Southern and Northern Dynasties, Sui, Tang, and Five Dynasties), supplemented with two sections of 30 scrolls each — tables mulu and critical analysis kaoyi.

Sima Guang departed from the format used in traditional Chinese dynastic histories which consisted primarily of annals of rulers, and biographies of officials. This represented a shift from a biographical style to a chronological style. Guang himself wrote in a memorial to the Emperor: "Since I was a child I have ranged through histories. It has appeared to me that in the annal-biography form the words are so diffuse and numerous that even an erudite scholar who reads them again and again cannot comprehend and sort them out. ... I have constantly wished to write a chronological history roughly in accordance with the form of the Tso-chuan (左傳), starting with the Warring States and going down to the Five Dynasties, drawing on other books besides the Official Histories and taking in all that a ruler ought to know — matters which are related to the rise and fall of dynasties and connected with the joys and sorrows of the people, and of which the good can become a model and the evil a warning."

Initially, Sima Guang hired Liu Shu and Zhao Junxi as his main assistants, but Zhao was soon replaced by Liu Ban, a Han history expert. In 1070 Emperor Shenzong approved Guang's request to add Fan Zuyu, a Tang history expert. Because Zizhi tongjian is a distillation from a large number (322) of disparate historical sources, the selection, drafting, and editing processes used in creating the work as well as potential political biases of Sima Guang, in particular, have been the subject of academic debate.

Derivative and commented works 
In the 12th century, Zhu Xi produced a reworked, condensed version of Zizhi Tongjian, known as Tongjian Gangmu, or Zizhi Tongjian Gangmu. This Manchu version was itself translated into French by Jesuit missionary Joseph-Anne-Marie de Moyriac de Mailla. His twelve-volume translation, "Histoire générale de la Chine, ou Annales de cet Empire; traduit du Tong-kien-kang-mou par de Mailla" was published posthumously in Paris in 1777–1783. The condensed Zizhi Tongjian Gangmu was also the main source for "Textes Historiques", a political history of China from antiquity to 906CE published in 1929 by another French Jesuit missionary Léon Wieger.

The Zhonghua Shuju edition contains textual criticism made by Yuan Dynasty historian Hu Sanxing. The philosopher Wang Fuzhi also wrote a commentary on Tongjian, titled "Comments after reading the Tongjian".

Historian Rafe de Crespigny has published annotated translations of chapters 54–59 and 59–69 under the titles "Emperor Huan and Emperor Ling" and "To Establish Peace" (Australian National University), respectively, covering 157–220 CE, building upon the publication of Achilles Fang's annotated translation of the next ten chapters (70–79) covering up to 265 CE. There are also self-published translations into English of Chapters 1–8, covering the years 403–207 BCE and some additional sections pertaining to the Xiongnu people.

Contents 

The book consisted of 294 chapters, of which the following number describe each respective dynastic era:
 5 chapters – Zhou (1046–256 BC)
 3 chapters – Qin (221–207 BC)
 60 chapters – Han (206 BC – 220 AD)
 10 chapters – Wei (220–265)
 40 chapters – Jin (266–420)
 16 chapters – Liu Song (420–479)
 10 chapters – Qi (479–502)
 22 chapters – Liang (502–557)
 10 chapters – Chen (557–589)
 8 chapters – Sui (589–618)
 81 chapters – Tang (618–907)
 6 chapters – Later Liang (907–923)
 8 chapters – Later Tang (923–936)
 6 chapters – Later Jin (936–947)
 4 chapters – Later Han (947–951)
 5 chapters – Later Zhou (951–960)

See also 

 Culture of the Song dynasty
 History of the Song dynasty
 Records of the Grand Historian

Notes

Citations

Sources 

 The first of a set of 72 volumes.
.
 With annotations and translation of Yang Kuan's textual research on the Warring States.

External links 

 Zizhi Tongjian "Comprehensive Mirror to Aid in Government" — Chinaknowledge
 
 Zizhi Tongjian (original text in Guoxue)

1080s books
11th-century Chinese books
11th-century history books
Chinese history texts
History books about the Five Dynasties and Ten Kingdoms
History books about the Han dynasty
History books about the Jin dynasty (266–420)
History books about the Northern and Southern dynasties
History books about the Qin dynasty
History books about the Sui dynasty
History books about the Tang dynasty
History books about the Three Kingdoms
Song dynasty literature